Roy Abergil (born 27 October 1990) is an Israeli footballer who plays as a forward for FC Tucson in USL League One.

References

External links
Profile at Colorado Mesa University Athletics
Profile at FC Tucson

1990 births
Living people
Association football forwards
Footballers from Beersheba
Israeli footballers
Maccabi Be'er Sheva F.C. players
F.C. Be'er Sheva players
Bnei Yehuda Tel Aviv F.C. players
F.C. Dimona players
Maccabi Kiryat Gat F.C. players
F.C. Shikun HaMizrah players
FC Tucson players
Hapoel Yerhuam F.C. players
Israeli expatriate footballers
Israeli expatriate sportspeople in the United States
Expatriate soccer players in the United States
USL League One players